Baden Baden is a Brazilian microbrewery, brewed in the city of Campos do Jordão, in the state of São Paulo.

Beer in Brazil
Companies based in São Paulo (state)
Kirin Group
Brazilian brands